IFK Bergvik is a Swedish football club located in Bergvik.

Background
IFK Bergvik currently plays in Division 4 Hälsingland which is the sixth tier of Swedish football. They play their home matches at the Bergviks IP in Bergvik.

The club is affiliated to Hälsinglands Fotbollförbund.

Season to season

In their most successful period IFK Bergvik competed in the following divisions:

In recent seasons IFK Bergvik have competed in the following divisions:

Footnotes

External links
 IFK Bergvik – Official website
 IFK Bergvik on Facebook

Sport in Gävleborg County
Football clubs in Gävleborg County
1920 establishments in Sweden
Bergvik